Eristalis arbustorum , the European drone fly, is an abundant Northern Hemisphere species of syrphid fly, originally first officially described by Linnaeus in 1758 as Musca arbustorum. The name "drone fly" is related to its similar appearance to the drone of the honeybee. Hoverflies get their names from the ability to remain nearly motionless while in flight. The  adults, also known as flower flies for they are commonly found around and on flowers from which they get both energy-giving nectar and protein rich pollen. The larvae are aquatic filter-feeders of the long-tailed type.

Description
External images
For terms see Morphology of Diptera
Wing length 7–10 mm. Arista plumose (at least basal half). Face entirely pale dusted (in rubbed specimens shining black median stripe). Hind femora pale at tip only. Resembles E. abusiva, but distinguished by the plumose arista, also less projecting mouth-edge and overall pubescence shorter. Top  of tibia 2 black.

The male genitalia are figured by Hippa et al. (2001)<ref>Hippa, H., Nielsen, T.R. & van Steenis, J. (2001) The west Palaearctic species of the genus Eristalis. Latreille (Diptera, Surphidae). Norw. J .Entomol. 48: 289–327.</ref> The larva is figured by Hartley (1961).

BiologyEristalis arbustorum is found in a wide range of wetlands and in alluvial softwood forest, temperate coniferous forests, boreal forests, taiga, and montane tundra, as well as farmland, urban parks and gardens. It visits the flowers of a wide range of low-growing plants and shrubs. The larva is aquatic, occurring in shallow, nutrient rich standing water and in cow-dung, silage pits and compost heaps. The species is known to be migratory in Europe.

DistributionEristalis arbustorum'' occurs throughout the Palaearctic, including North Africa, as well as in North India (Indomalayan realm). In North America, the species was introduced near Toronto around 1885 and is now ubiquitous throughout much of the United States and Canada.
distribution map

References

Eristalinae
Diptera of Africa
Diptera of Asia
Diptera of Europe
Flies described in 1758
Taxa named by Carl Linnaeus